A River Bluff or Riverbluff is a very steep and broad hill or small cliff, next to a river.

River Bluff or Riverbluff may also refer to:

River Bluff, Kentucky, a city in Oldham County
Riverbluff Cave, a paleontological site near Springfield, Missouri
River Bluff High School, in Lexington, South Carolina
River Bluff (Wintergreen, Virginia), a historic home

See also
Bluff River (disambiguation)